Silvia Joy Smith (22 December 1939 – 6 March 2020) was an Australian politician. She was a member of the Australian Labor Party (ALP), serving in the Australian House of Representatives from 1993 to 1996 and the Tasmanian Legislative Council from 1997 to 2003.

Early life
Smith was born on 22 December 1939 in Wivenhoe, Tasmania. She worked as a schoolteacher from 1959 to 1988.

Politics
Smith was an officeholder in the ALP's West Launceston branch and was a delegate to the party's state council from 1987. She was elected to the House of Representatives at the 1993 federal election, winning Bass for the ALP from the incumbent Liberal MP Warwick Smith. She was elected with a narrow margin of 40 votes on the two-party-preferred count.

In parliament, Smith served on the House standing committees on community affairs and employment, education and training. Her Liberal predecessor Warwick Smith reclaimed the seat at the 1996 election. In 1997, she ran for and was elected to the Tasmanian Legislative Council electorate of Windermere as an Independent Labor candidate. She served for one six-year term before being defeated by conservative independent Ivan Dean, at the 2003 periodic elections.

Personal life
Smith had two daughters with her husband Jack. They were also foster parents to several other children.

Smith died on 6 March 2020, aged 80, having been diagnosed with Parkinson's disease 15 years earlier.

References

1939 births
2020 deaths
Australian Labor Party members of the Parliament of Australia
Members of the Australian House of Representatives
Members of the Australian House of Representatives for Bass
Women members of the Australian House of Representatives
21st-century Australian politicians
21st-century Australian women politicians
20th-century Australian politicians
People from Burnie, Tasmania
Women members of the Tasmanian Legislative Council
Members of the Tasmanian Legislative Council
20th-century Australian women politicians
Australian schoolteachers
People with Parkinson's disease